Tinashe Panyangara (born 21 October 1985 in Marondera) is a Zimbabwean cricketer. He is a right-arm fast-medium bowler.

Panyangara first came to prominence during the under-19s World Cup in Bangladesh in 2003-04 in which he bowled 6 for 31 in a surprising victory for the Zimbabweans. Panyangara was rated as one of the fastest Zimbabwean bowlers in their history. Following the sacking of fifteen rebel players in 2004, he found himself launched into the Zimbabwean squad instead of being able to complete his A-levels as he had previously wished.

Panyangara plays cricket in England during the summer months at Barkisland Cricket Club. He has since moved to Nottingham where he plays for the West Indies Cavaliers. Recently he has started playing for the CATS Cricket Club in Australia.

References

External links 
 

1985 births
Living people
Zimbabwe Test cricketers
Zimbabwe One Day International cricketers
Zimbabwe Twenty20 International cricketers
Zimbabwean cricketers
Manicaland cricketers
Cricketers at the 2011 Cricket World Cup
Sportspeople from Marondera
Cricketers at the 2015 Cricket World Cup
Mid West Rhinos cricketers